The Somali Democratic Action Front (SODAF; Somali: Ururka Dhaqdhaqaaqa Dimuqraadiyada Soomaaliyeed) is the first political faction of the Somali Rebellion.

Activities 

Led by the former erstwhile and beloved mayor of Mogadishu, Omar Hassan Mohamud "Istarliin", it was the first primary opposition of the Siad Barre regime established in Rome in 1976 by exiled politicians who fled from regime reprisals after the execution of the former Minister of Defence General Salaad Gabeyre Kediye accused of organising a counter coup.  

Initially powerful both economically and diplomatically, following the start of the war with Ethiopia in the summer of 1977, SODAF had been invited to merge with the Somali Salvation Front (SSF) led by Colonel Abdullahi Yusuf and two other small parties to form the Somali Salvation Democratic Front (SSDF) with the approval and assistance of President Jomo Kenyatta and his vice-president Daniel Arap Moi before the SSDF moved to Ethiopia and set up a military base there.

References
 

Factions in the Somali Civil War